The men's team tennis event was part of the tennis programme and took place between October 3 and 7, at the Hiroshima Regional Park Tennis Stadium.

India won the gold medal beating Indonesia in the final.

Schedule
All times are Japan Standard Time (UTC+09:00)

Results

1st round

Quarterfinals

Semifinals

Final

References 

Page 22
Page 24
Page 24
Page 53

External links 
 Olympic Council of Asia

Men's team